is a passenger railway station located in Aoba-ku, Yokohama, Kanagawa Prefecture, Japan, operated by the private railway company Tokyu Corporation.

Lines

Station layout 
The station consists of two opposed elevated side platforms serving two tracks, with the station building underneath.

Platforms

History
Tana Station was opened on April 1, 1966.

Lines
Tokyu Corporation
Den-en-toshi Line

Station layout
Tana Station  has two opposed elevated side platforms serving two tracks. The platforms are connected to the station building by underpasses.

Passenger statistics
In fiscal 2019, the station was used by an average of 11,038 passengers daily. 

The passenger figures for previous years are as shown below.

Surrounding area
Tana Elementary School
 Manpuku-ji

See also
 List of railway stations in Japan

References

External links

 

Railway stations in Kanagawa Prefecture
Railway stations in Japan opened in 1966
Railway stations in Yokohama